Linear B is an album by multi-instrumentalist and composer Joe McPhee, recorded in 1990 and first released on the Swiss HatHut label.

Reception

Allmusic reviewer Brian Olewnick states "Linear B covers enough of McPhee's stylistic oeuvre, and is fine enough in and of itself, to make it an excellent introduction to his work. Recommended".

Track listing 
All compositions by Joe McPhee except as indicated
 "Love Life" - 9:59
 "Make a Circle" - 7:35
 "Linear B" - 4:39
 "Say That to Say This" - 5:14
 "Footprints" (Wayne Shorter) - 10:25
 "Little Piece 1" - 2:05
 "Little Piece 2" - 2:20
 "Little Piece 3" - 2:16
 "Little Piece 4" - 2:01
 "Little Piece 5" - 2:16
 "Here's That Rainy Day" (Johnny Burke, Jimmy Van Heusen) - 5:44
 "Imagine a World Without Art" - 5:52
 "Voices" - 6:38

Personnel 
Joe McPhee - flugelhorn, pocket trumpet, soprano saxophone, electronics
André Jaume - clarinet, bass clarinet, tenor saxophone (tracks 1, 5, 8 & 12)  
Urs Leimgruber - soprano saxophone, tenor saxophone (tracks 2 & 4)
Christy Doran (tracks 7 & 13), Raymond Boni (tracks 1, 5, 9, 12 & 13)  - guitar
Léon Francioli  - bass (tracks 1, 3, 5, 6 & 11-13)
Fritz Hauser - drums (tracks  1-3, 5-10 & 12)

References 

 

Joe McPhee albums
1991 albums
Hathut Records albums